Lake Hévíz is located in Hévíz, Hungary, near the western end of Lake Balaton,  from Keszthely.

It is the largest swimmable thermal lake in the world ( the in area), second only to Frying Pan Lake in New Zealand, which is too hot for swimming. The flow of water is very strong and the water in the lake is completely replenished every 72 hours. Its minimum depth is 2 meters, reaching a maximum depth of 38 meters, exactly at the point where the hot thermal water comes out to the surface.

Microscopic organisms of the lake 
The fauna and flora are unique in Lake Hévíz due to the temperature and chemical composition of the water,  which contains carbonic acid, calcium, magnesium, hydrogen carbonate, reduced sulfuric compounds as well as oxygen in solution. Several species so far can be found only in this lake.

Bacteria is the dominant life form in the lake; it is possible that this is a cause of the curative effect. Several taxa can be found here. Most common Cyanobacteria are filamentous blue-green algae (Oscillatoria princeps, O. tenuis, O. jasoruensis, O. chlorina, Spirulina major). Half of the blue species are thermophile, stenoterm ones. There are two thermophile blue green alga species (Pseudanabaena papillaterminata, Pseudanabaena crassa) of which Lake Hévíz is the only Hungarian habitat.

Bacterial tektons are typical of the lake. The crater is covered mostly by Thiothrix sp. and Beggiatoa sp. from a depth of 1.5 m to the opening of the springcave. These together with the bacterium species play an important role in the lake's sulfur cycle.

Actinomycetes (Streptomyces sp., Micromonospora sp.) are also worth mentioning. Micromonospora heviziensis for instance, a very powerful protein and cellulose decomposer, can only be found here in the world. Microbispora amethystogenes on the other hand, which accumulates iodine in its cells, is to be found in only few lakes in the world. Unfortunately this latter species has not been found in the lake since the 1980s as a result of excessive mining.
Changing environment affected other bacteria as well. Micromonospora carbonacea and M. chalcea was not detected in the 1990s. Actinomycetes communities have become dominated by Micromonospora purpureochromogenes, while M. heviziensis was suppressed. Antibiotics secreting Streptomyces are likely to be found.

Green algae – especially Chlorella sp. – are present all over the lake except for the springcave and its surroundings. Navicula cryptocephala and Navicula capitatoradiata are common diatoms in the lake. The biodiversity of the phytoplankton is poor and its biomass is low, thus the lake's trophic level ranges from oligotrophic to mesotrophic.

There are two new species of Nematoda: Crocodolrylaimus thermalis and Neoactinolaimus tepidus. There can be found real rarities among Rotatorias as well (Epiphanes brachionus var. Spinosus, Lecane inermis), which are only present in warm waters. Jenő Ponyi has described the lake's primitive crustaceans in detail. Also a unique Hydracarina acarus is said to have found its habitat outside the fence surrounding the lake.

Medicinal properties
The waters are reported to be beneficial to patients with rheumatic diseases and locomotor disorders, among others.  There is a thriving health tourism industry in the area.

See also
 Hévíz Spa

References

External links 

 nature conservation areas of Balaton Uplands National Park
 Heviz
 pictures and maps, diving in lake Hévíz

Heviz
Geography of Zala County
Hot springs of Hungary
Heviz
Tourist attractions in Zala County
Volcanoes of Hungary